Live in Santa Monica may refer to:

 Live in Santa Monica (Pink Floyd album), a bootleg recording
 Live in Santa Monica (Ebi album), released in 2001
 Live Santa Monica '72, David Bowie album, released in 2008